Donna Lee (born July 27, 1960) is an American former field hockey player who competed in the 1988 Summer Olympics. She was born in Boston, Massachusetts and attended the University of Iowa, where she played for the Hawkeyes.

References

External links
 

1960 births
Living people
American female field hockey players
Iowa Hawkeyes field hockey players
Olympic field hockey players of the United States
Field hockey players at the 1988 Summer Olympics
Sportspeople from Boston
20th-century American women